The Eleventh Oklahoma Legislature was a meeting of the legislative branch of the government of Oklahoma, composed of the Oklahoma Senate and the Oklahoma House of Representatives. The state legislature met in Oklahoma City, in regular session from January 4 to March 24, 1927, and in special session from December 6 through 29, 1927, during the term of Governor Henry S. Johnston.

Dates of sessions
Regular session: January 4-March 24, 1927
Special session: December 6–29, 1927
Previous: 10th Legislature • Next: 12th Legislature

Party composition

Senate

House of Representatives

Leadership
Lieutenant Governor William J. Holloway served as President of the Senate, giving him a tie-breaking vote and the authority to serve as presiding officer. Mac Q. Williamson served as President pro tempore of the Oklahoma Senate in 1927. D.A. Stovall served as Speaker of the Oklahoma House of Representatives.

Members

Senate

Table based on state almanac.

House of Representatives

Table based on government database.

References

External links
Oklahoma Legislature
Oklahoma House of Representatives
Oklahoma Senate

Oklahoma legislative sessions
1927 in Oklahoma
1928 in Oklahoma
1927 U.S. legislative sessions
1928 U.S. legislative sessions